United Nations Advisory Committee of Local Authorities (UNACLA) is a committee of local authorities that serves as an advisory
body to United Nations System for the purpose of strengthening the dialogue with local authorities from all over the
world involved in the implementation of the Habitat Agenda.

It was established in 2000 in line with the UN Habitat Governing Council Resolution 17/18 of 1999. Since September 2004, when UN-HABITAT established a formal relationship with United Cities and Local Governments, the latter names the organization's chairperson & holds 10 of its 20 seats. UNACLA secretariat is split between Barcelona (UCLG headquarters) & Nairobi (UN-HABITAT headquarters).

Currently UNACLA is chaired by Ilsur Metshin, UCLG-Euroasia President, Mayor of Kazan (Republic of Tatarstan, Russian Federation), elected during 2019 UCLG World Summit in Durban (South Africa). He was immediately preceded in 2011-2019 by Kadir Topbaş, Mayor of Istanbul (Turkey).

References 

United Cities and Local Governments
United Nations Human Settlements Programme